Primal Park is the debut studio album by Australian rock band Mondo Rock, released in October 1979 and peaked at number 40 on the Kent Music Report. The album is a mixture of live recordings (tracks 1, 6–9) and studio recordings (tracks 2–5).  It spawned the non-charting singles "Searching for My Baby" and "Primal Park", both of which were studio recordings. In 2009, the album was remastered and included eight bonus tracks.

Track listing 
Side A
 "Question Time" (Gunther Gorman) – 3:38
 "Down to Earth" (Kim Fowley, Ross Wilson) – 4:06
 "Primal Park" (David Pepperell, R. Wilson) – 4:15
 "Searching for My Baby" (R. Wilson) – 2:52
 "Tell Me" (Iain McLennan) – 4:21

Side B
 "Toughen Up" (R. Wilson) – 3:45
 "Down Down" Down Down (R. Wilson) – 4:29
 "The Rebel" (R. Wilson, Tony Slavich) – 5:26
 "Live Wire" – The Mondo Shakedown (R. Wilson, Simon Gyllies) – 6:56

2009 Bonus tracks – Singles A's And B's 1978/79
 "The Fugitive Kind" (R. Wilson, T. Slavich) – 3:35
 "The Breaking Point" (I. McLennan) – 4:57
 "Send Me Someone" (R. Wilson) – 3:18
 "Love Shock" (Peter Laffy, R. Wilson) – 3:10
 "Don't You Lie to Me" (Chuck Berry) – 2:51
 "Louie Louie" (Richard Berry) – 4:56
 "Telephone Booth" (R. Wilson, Stephen Cummings) – 3:16
 "Perhaps Perhaps" (R. Wilson, S. Cummings) – 3:11

Personnel
Mondo Rock:
Ross Wilson – vocals, harmonica
Randy Bulpin – guitar, slide guitar
Peter Laffy – guitar, vocals
Rex Bullen – keyboards (tracks 2-5 only)
Simon Gyllies – bass
Iain McLennan – drums
also:
Tony Slavich – keyboards (on bonus tracks 10, 11)
Gil Matthews – drums (on bonus tracks 14–17)

with:
Sunil De Silva – percussion
Eddie Rayner – synthesizer
Andrew Bell – additional vocals

Production team:
Producer – Ross Wilson
Engineers – Ern Rose and Jim Barton (tracks 1, 6-9: recorded live at Le Club Bombay Rock, Melbourne, 18 May 1979)
Engineers – Mal Devenish, Richard Lush, Tony Cohen (tracks 2–5)
Mixed by – Ross Cockle

Charts

References 

1979 debut albums
Mondo Rock albums
Albums produced by Ross Wilson
EMI Records albums